Fred Diehl (1921 - November 15, 2008) was a Canadian radio and television actor and writer, most noted as the recipient of the John Drainie Award for lifetime achievement in Canadian broadcasting at the 14th ACTRA Awards in 1985.

He was born in Cypress River, Manitoba, the brother of broadcaster Alden Diehl. He began his career as an announcer for CBC Radio's CBX in Edmonton, Alberta in 1948, before moving to Toronto in the 1950s, where he was a writer for the variety television series Holiday Ranch, and a performer in various CBC drama anthology series, including a supporting role in the pilot episode of Wojeck.

In 1966 he joined CBR in Calgary as a producer of radio documentaries, In 1970 he was producer of a radio adaptation of W.O. Mitchell's Jake and the Kid. In the 1980s he was a producer of radio dramas for CBC Radio, including the series Nightfall and Sunday Matinee, and won an ACTRA Award for The Panther and the Jaguar at the 13th ACTRA Awards in 1984.

References

External links

1921 births
2008 deaths
20th-century Canadian male actors
20th-century Canadian male writers
20th-century Canadian dramatists and playwrights
Canadian male television actors
Canadian male film actors
Canadian male radio actors
Canadian male stage actors
Canadian male dramatists and playwrights
Canadian radio writers
CBC Radio hosts
Canadian radio producers
Canadian television writers